Empyreuma anassa is a moth of the subfamily Arctiinae. It was described by William Trowbridge Merrifield Forbes in 1917. It is found on Jamaica.

See also
 Anassa, a Greek word meaning "queen"

References

Euchromiina
Moths described in 1917